= 侍 =

侍 is a Chinese character with meanings:

- serve, attend upon
- attendant, servant

It may refer to:

- Samurai
- Name for offices in charge of royal affairs during the Joseon Dynasty
